Lorenz Jaeger (23 September 1892 – 1 April 1975) was a German cardinal of the Roman Catholic Church, who served as Archbishop of Paderborn from 1941 to 1973, and was elevated to the cardinalate in 1965.

Biography
Lorenz Jaeger was born in Halle, and studied at the Academy of Paderborn and University of Munich. Ordained on 1 April 1922, he then did pastoral work in Paderborn until 1926. He taught at Studenrat Herne in Westphalia (1926–1933) and at Hindenburg Realgymnasium in Dortmund (1933–1939). During World War II, he served as a military chaplain from 1939 to 1941.

On 10 August 1941, Jaeger was appointed Archbishop of Paderborn by Pope Pius XII. He received his episcopal consecration on the following 19 October from Archbishop Cesare Orsenigo, with Bishops Joseph Machens and Augustus Baumann serving as co-consecrators. From 1962 to 1965, Jaeger attended the Second Vatican Council, with Heribert Mühlen serving as his peritus, or theological expert. The Archbishop claimed that the Church had come to the "end of the Constantinian era," and needed to update the presentation of its teachings as time progressed.

Pope Paul VI created him Cardinal Priest of San Leone I in the consistory of 22 February 1965. Jäger later sat on the commission of cardinals instructed to examine the Dutch Catechism for theological orthodoxy. Upon reaching the age of 80 on 23 September 1972, he lost the right to participate in any future papal conclaves, an opportunity which he never received. The Cardinal resigned as Paderborn's archbishop on 30 June 1973, after thirty-one years of service.

A dedicated ecumenist, Jäger founded the Johann Adam Möhler Ecumenical Institute (named after the German theologian) and helped establish, along with Augustin Bea, the Secretariat for Promoting Christian Unity in the Roman Curia.

Jäger died in Paderborn, at age 82. He is buried in the Metropolitan Cathedral of Paderborn.

References

External links
Cardinals of the Holy Roman Church
Catholic-Hierarchy

1892 births
1975 deaths
Participants in the Second Vatican Council
Archbishops of Paderborn
20th-century German cardinals
German Roman Catholic archbishops
People from Halle (Saale)
People from the Province of Saxony
Ludwig Maximilian University of Munich alumni
Cardinals created by Pope Paul VI
German military chaplains
World War II chaplains
Grand Crosses 1st class of the Order of Merit of the Federal Republic of Germany